Mario Escobar (born 14 February 1940) is a former Colombian cyclist. He competed in the individual road race at the 1964 Summer Olympics.

References

External links
 

1940 births
Living people
Colombian male cyclists
Olympic cyclists of Colombia
Cyclists at the 1964 Summer Olympics
Place of birth missing (living people)
20th-century Colombian people